Robert "Robby" Franco (born August 23, 1993) is a Mexican-American freestyle skier. He competed for the United States of America in the 2015 FIS Freestyle World Ski Championships, and for Mexico in the 2017 championships.

He represented Mexico in the 2018 Winter Olympics.

Early life 
Franco was born in San Jose, California to an American mother and a Mexican father from Guadalajara.

Career

2018 Winter Olympics
He was one of several skiers hoping to make the Mexican squad for the 2018 Olympics, alongside alpinists Rodolfo Dickson, Prince Hubertus of Hohenlohe-Langenburg, Sarah Schleper, Sandra Hillen in snowboard. He qualified for the 2018 Winter Olympics, alongside alpinists Rodolfo Dickson and Sarah Schleper, and cross-country skier Germán Madrazo.

References

External links

1993 births
Living people
American male freestyle skiers
Mexican male freestyle skiers
Olympic freestyle skiers of Mexico
Freestyle skiers at the 2018 Winter Olympics
American sportspeople of Mexican descent
Sportspeople from San Jose, California